Ma Dong-seok (born March 1, 1971) is a South Korean–American actor.

Film

Television

As actor

As creator

Music video

References

South Korean filmographies